Dmitry Pantov (born 12 September 1969) is a Kazakhstani biathlete. He competed at the 1994 Winter Olympics, the 1998 Winter Olympics and the 2002 Winter Olympics.

References

External links
 

1969 births
Living people
Kazakhstani male biathletes
Olympic biathletes of Kazakhstan
Biathletes at the 1994 Winter Olympics
Biathletes at the 1998 Winter Olympics
Biathletes at the 2002 Winter Olympics
People from Pavlodar
Asian Games medalists in biathlon
Biathletes at the 1996 Asian Winter Games
Biathletes at the 1999 Asian Winter Games
Medalists at the 1996 Asian Winter Games
Medalists at the 1999 Asian Winter Games
Asian Games gold medalists for Kazakhstan
Asian Games bronze medalists for Kazakhstan
20th-century Kazakhstani people
21st-century Kazakhstani people